Sampath Ram is an Indian actor who works primarily in Tamil-language films. He is known for his villainous roles.

Career 
Ram started his acting career with the television series  Ethanai Manithargal that aired on Doordarshan as a thug. He made his film debut with Mudhalvan (1999), where he played a sub-inspector of police. The film, however, failed to provide the actor a major break. Ram survived a head injury while shooting for Dheena (2001). After Dheena, he starred in several films as a thug. About twenty years later, Ram landed in a meaty role in Thimiru Pudichavan (2018). Post Thimiru Pudichavan, he garnered acclaim for his performance as an aghori in Kanchana 3. Ram signed Thatrom Thookrom, where he essays the main antagonist. His two-hundredth film Kasa Kasaa features him in the lead role.

Filmography

Tamil-language films

Other language films

Television

Web series

References

External links 

Tamil male actors
Indian male film actors
20th-century Indian male actors
21st-century Indian male actors
Male actors in Malayalam cinema
Male actors in Kannada cinema
Male actors in Tamil cinema
Male actors in Telugu cinema
Living people
Year of birth missing (living people)